Club 57 is a television series developed by Rainbow SpA and Nickelodeon in collaboration with RAI. It was created by Catharina Ledoboer and produced by Iginio Straffi and Pierluigi Gazzolo. The show follows a student from the 21st century named Eva (Evaluna Montaner) who accidentally travels to the year 1957, where she falls in love with an Italian greaser named JJ (Riccardo Frascari).

An unaired pilot episode for the series was filmed at Viacom's Miami studio in 2016. The first season consists of sixty 45-minute episodes, which were filmed in both the Apulia region of Italy and Miami. It made its world premiere on Rai Gulp in Italy on 15 April 2019. Rai Gulp divided the season into four 15-episode waves. In Latin America, the season premiered on Nickelodeon on 6 May 2019; all sixty episodes were aired daily over two months.

In October 2019, Rainbow SpA's Andrea Graciotti stated that a second season was in development. The second season premiered on Nickelodeon Latin America with its first 30 episodes between 14 June and 23 July 2021. The next 30 episodes premiered between 13 September and 22 October 2021.

Overview

Episodes

Wave 1

Wave 2

Wave 3

Wave 4

References

Club 57
Club 57
Club 57